Adlam is a Unicode block containing characters from the Adlam script, an alphabetic script devised during the late 1980s for writing the Fula language in Guinea, Nigeria, Liberia, and other nearby countries.

History
In June 2016, Adlam was added to the Unicode Standard with the release of version 9.0.

In October 2017, Google released a Noto font that supports the block, Noto Sans Adlam, although it did not handle prenasalized consonants properly.

On 3 October 2018, Microsoft released an updated Ebrima font to support Adlam alphabet to Windows Insiders as part of the Windows 10 version 1903 feature update, starting from build 18252.

Characters

History
The following Unicode-related documents record the purpose and process of defining specific characters in the Adlam block:

See also 
Numerals in Unicode

References 

Unicode blocks
Fula language
2016 introductions